Jessica Hopton (born 28 November 1996) is an English badminton player.

Career
In 2021, she became a national champion of England after winning the women's doubles, with Jessica Pugh at the 2021 English National Badminton Championships.

Achievements

BWF International (1 title, 3 runners-up) 
Women's doubles

Mixed doubles

  BWF International Challenge tournament
  BWF International Series tournament
  BWF Future Series tournament

BWF Junior International (1 title) 
Girls' doubles

  BWF Junior International Grand Prix tournament
  BWF Junior International Challenge tournament
  BWF Junior International Series tournament
  BWF Junior Future Series tournament

References

1996 births
Living people
English female badminton players